Halaku is a 1956 Hindi language film with Pran in the title role playing Hulagu.

The cast includes Meena Kumari, Ajit, Minoo Mumtaz, Raj Mehra, Shammi and Veena.

Plot 
Halaku (Pran), the powerful emperor of Iran, rules the country wisely and with an iron hand. When he comes upon one of his subjects, Niloufer (Meena Kumari), he stakes his claim on her and wants her to be his wife, despite of his wife (Minoo Mumtaz), who opposes his marriage plans. Niloufer, who loves Pervez (Ajit Khan), refuses to submit to Halaku, he turns his wrath on both Niloufer, Pervez, and his wife. Will Niloufer and Pervez survive the ruthless Halaku?

Music
 "Use Mil Gayi Nayi Zindagi" - Lata Mangeshkar
 "Aaja Ke Intizar Me, Jane Ko Hai Bahar Bhi" - Lata Mangeshkar, Mohammed Rafi
 "Yeh Chand Yeh Sitare Yeh Sath Teraa Mera" - Lata Mangeshkar
 "Aji Chale Aao, Tumhe Aankho Ne Dil Me Bulaya" - Lata Mangeshkar, Asha Bhosle
 "Bol Mere Malik Teraa Kya Yahee Hai Insaf" - Lata Mangeshkar
 "O Sunta Ja, Dil Ka Nagma Pyar Ki Dhun Par" - Lata Mangeshkar
 "Dil Ka Na Karna Aitbar Koi" - Mohammed Rafi, Lata Mangeshkar
 "Teri Duniya Se Jate Hain, Chupaye Dil Me Gam Apna" - Lata Mangeshkar

Cast
 Pran as Sultan Halaku Khan
 Ajit as Parvez 
 Meena Kumari as Nilofar Nadir 
 Minoo Mumtaz
 Raj Mehra 	
 Sunder 	
 Shammi: Navbahar 
 Veena: Maharani 
 Niranjan Sharma
 Helen as Dancer

References

External links
 

1956 films
1950s Hindi-language films
Films scored by Shankar–Jaikishan
Hulagu Khan
Indian musical films
1956 musical films
Indian black-and-white films